Khabar Lahariya (translation: News Wave) is an Indian newspaper, published in various rural dialects of Hindi, including Bundeli, Avadhi and Bajjika dialects. The newspaper was started by Nirantar, a New Delhi-based non-government organisation which focuses on gender and education. Initially seen as a women-only publication, it now covers local political news, local crime reports, social issues and entertainment, all reported from a feminist perspective. As of September 2012, its total print-run, all editions included, was around 6000 copies; the management claimed an estimated readership of 80,000. Since its digitalisation its outreach has massively extended.

Circulation and reach
Started in 2002, Khabar Lahariya became an eight-page weekly local newspaper. The first issue of the paper was published in May 2002 from the town of Karwi in Chitrakoot district of Uttar Pradesh, in the local Bundeli dialect of Hindi. In 2012, the newspaper launched editions from Mahoba, Lucknow and Varanasi districts of Uttar Pradesh in Bundeli, Awadhi and Bhojpuri dialects respectively. The newspaper also has an edition published from the Sitamarhi district of Bihar in Bajjikka dialect, and from Banda, Uttar Pradesh, in the Bundeli dialect. As of September 2012, its total print-run, all editions included, was around 6000 copies sold in about 600 villages in Uttar Pradesh and Bihar with an estimated readership of 20,000.

The website of Khabar Lahariya was launched on 13 February 2013 in Mumbai. The website, which bears a striking resemblance to the printed newspaper, curates and republishes the best articles of the newspaper. It is also the only website where content is available in the local dialects in which the newspaper is brought out. Some stories on the website are now available in English.

Starting in 2016, the newspaper shifted largely to a digital format launching a video channel and creating news in video clips. The women journalists collective now runs a digital media agency covering stories from rural India, mostly from the state of Uttar Pradesh. As a result of digitalisation, the news outlet has substantially increased its reach. Owing to the support of the readers' community, Khabar Lahariya grew from a local newspaper in 2002 to publishing their own website in 2013, and launching their own subscription model, Sound, Fury and 4G in 2019. .

Distinctive features
The intellectual input for the newspaper is provided by a collective of 40 rural women journalists. The newspaper  is written, edited, produced, distributed and marketed entirely by rural women from disadvantaged communities (Scheduled Castes and Scheduled Tribes, Dalits and Muslims). The women who report the stories also edit, produce, distribute and market the newspaper. Meera Jatav is the Editor-in-Chief and has been working from Karwi since the newspaper was started in 2002. The newspaper specialises in exposing local scandals. It mainly carries local news that, although primarily of interest to its rural readership, has wider resonance nationally and internationally. Examples are reports on violence against women, discrimination against Dalits, deaths in illegal mining operations, and the rise of Hindu nationalism.

Awards and recognition
In 2004, the collective of women journalists bringing out Khabar Lahariya was awarded the prestigious Chameli Devi Jain Award for Women in Journalism.
In 2009, the newspaper was awarded the UNESCO King Sejong Literacy Prize. Following this, plans to expand the newspaper were made.
In 2012, the newspaper went on to win the Laadli Media Award for gender sensitive reporting. Also, in the same year Indian news channel Times Now awarded Khabar Lahariya the Amazing Indian Award.
In 2013 the newspaper was presented with the Kaifi Azmi Award in memory of poet Kaifi Azmi. The award is presented by the All India Kaifi Azmi Academy every year on the anniversary of his death.<ref name=kaifiyat.in>{{cite news|title=Kaifi Azmi’s 11th death anniversary|url=http://www.kaifiyat.in/kaifi-azmis-11th-death-anniversary=}}</ref>

In 2014, German media channel Deutsche Welle awarded the prestigious Global Media Forum Award to the newspaper's website at the Best of Blogs annual conference held in Bonn in Germany.

An Indian documentary film about the newspaper titled Writing with Fire'' was released in 2021. It has won numerous international awards, including some at the 2021 Sundance Film Festival, and was nominated for the Academy Award for Best Documentary Feature at the 94th Academy Awards. The publication also won a Courage Award from the International Women's Media Foundation in June for how it "disrupts and interrogates the status quo, where newsmakers have long been male, upper-caste, and politically connected".

References

External links
Khabar Lahariya Website
The Times of India, Lucknow edition
Columbia Journalism Review
Nirantar
Aadiwasi Janjagruti

2002 establishments in Uttar Pradesh
Weekly newspapers published in India
Publications established in 2002
Newspapers published in Uttar Pradesh
Chitrakoot district